Enes Demirović (born 13 June 1972) is a retired Bosnian-Herzegovinian footballer.

International career
He made his debut in Bosnia and Herzegovina's first ever official international game, a November 1995 friendly match away against Albania, and has earned a total of 13 caps, scoring no goals. His final international was a June 2001 FIFA World Cup qualification match against Spain.

References

External links
Player profile at PrvaLiga 
Player profile at TFF

1972 births
Living people
People from Banovići
Association football midfielders
Bosnia and Herzegovina footballers
Bosnia and Herzegovina international footballers
NK Triglav Kranj players
ND Gorica players
HNK Hajduk Split players
Adanaspor footballers
İstanbulspor footballers
Hapoel Petah Tikva F.C. players
Hapoel Kfar Saba F.C. players
Hapoel Ironi Kiryat Shmona F.C. players
NK Brda players
Slovenian PrvaLiga players
Croatian Football League players
Süper Lig players
Israeli Premier League players
Liga Leumit players
Bosnia and Herzegovina expatriate footballers
Expatriate footballers in Slovenia
Bosnia and Herzegovina expatriate sportspeople in Slovenia
Expatriate footballers in Croatia
Bosnia and Herzegovina expatriate sportspeople in Croatia
Expatriate footballers in Turkey
Bosnia and Herzegovina expatriate sportspeople in Turkey
Expatriate footballers in Israel
Bosnia and Herzegovina expatriate sportspeople in Israel